Vernasca is a comune (municipality) in the Province of Piacenza in the Italian region Emilia-Romagna, located about  northwest of Bologna and about  southeast of Piacenza. 

The municipality of Vernasca contains the frazioni (subdivisions, mainly villages and hamlets) Bacedasco, Borla, Castelletto, Mignano, Settesorelle, Trinità, Vezzolacca, and Vigoleno.

Vernasca borders the following municipalities: Alseno, Bore, Castell'Arquato, Lugagnano Val d'Arda, Morfasso, Pellegrino Parmense, Salsomaggiore Terme.

References

External links
 Official website
 Comunita' Montana Valli del Nure e dell'Arda
 Vernasca Busker Festival
 Vernasca on The Campanile Project

Cities and towns in Emilia-Romagna